is a Japanese multinational manufacturer of detergent, soap, medications, and oral hygiene products and other toiletries. The company also has a chemical engineering research division which works on developing new products.

References

External links
 
 Lion Corporation (Thailand) Limited
 Southern Lion Sdn. Bhd. (Malaysia joint venture)

Brands of toothpaste
Chemical companies based in Tokyo
Companies listed on the Tokyo Stock Exchange
Cosmetics companies of Japan
Dental companies
Fuyo Group
Japanese companies established in 1891
Manufacturing companies based in Tokyo
Personal care brands
Personal care companies
Pharmaceutical companies based in Tokyo
Pharmaceutical companies established in 1918